Montabella Community School District is a school district serving Edmore, Blanchard, McBride and Six Lakes Michigan, United States. The superintendent is Ms. Shelly Millis. The district operates two schools: Montabella Junior/Senior High School and Montabella Elementary.

Administration 
The district offices are located at 302 West Main Street in Edmore.

Administrators 
Ms. Shelly Millis–Superintendent
–Business Manager
Ms. Patti Hicks–Assistant Bookkeeper
Ms. Jacki Fredricks–Curriculum Director/Technology Coordinator
Shane Riley-Junior/Senior High School Principal
Mr. Michael Moore –Elementary Principal

Board of Education 
Ms. Jann LaPointe–President
Mr. Chris Rasmussen–Vice President
Ms. Emily Longnecker–Secretary
Ms. Sherri Miel–Trustee
Mr. Tim Eldred–Trustee
Mr. Ivan Renne–Trustee
Mr. Dennis Stratton–Trustee

Selected Former Superintendents 
Previous assignment and reason for departure denoted in parentheses
Dr. Randall D. Bos (Superintendent - Losco Intermediate School District, named Superintendent of Waterloo Central School District
Mark W. Higgins - Interim Superintendent, July 2010. At the time was the youngest Superintendent in the state of Michigan.

Montabella High School 

Montabella Junior/Senior High School is located at 1324 East North County Line Road in Blanchard, and serves grades 7 through 12. The current principal is Mr. Shane Riley.

Montabella Elementary 

Montabella Elementary is located at 1456 East North County Line Road and serves grades K through 6. The current principal is Mr. Michael Moore.

References

External links
Official site

Education in Isabella County, Michigan
School districts in Michigan